Wattle Grove  is a suburb of Perth, Western Australia, located within the City of Kalamunda.

Description
Wattle Grove is approximately 2/3 semi-rural, and 1/3 suburban development. It contains some of Hartfield Park, and extends from Crystal Brook Road to Roe Highway.
Major transport routes through the suburb are Welshpool Road, Hale Road, Tonkin Highway and Roe Highway.

Public transport
Bus routes are:
 280 to High Wycombe Station or to Westfield Carousel via Cannington Train Station and East Cannington.
 281 to Lesmurdie Senior High School or to Darling Range Sports College.
 282 to Kalamunda bus station via Welshpool Road East or to Elizabeth Quay bus station via Oats Street railway station, Victoria Park transfer station and the city.
 283 to Kalamunda bus station via Crystal Brook Road or to Elizabeth Quay bus station via Oats Street railway station, Victoria Park transfer station and the city.

The nearest train stations are:
  Kenwick railway station on the Armadale line
  Beckenham railway station on the Armadale line
  Cannington railway station on the Armadale line
  High Wycombe railway station on the Airport line.

Facilities
Playgrounds are located throughout the new subdivisions in the suburb, as well as walking and bike paths leading to newly created artificial lakes.

Wattle Grove is served by Wattle Grove Primary School, and a Community TAFE Centre in Lewis Road and the Bible College of Western Australia (private). The primary school built on the area bordered by St John Road, Tomah Road, and Acastus Road opened to students in 2011. The previous primary school on Welshpool Road was mothballed with no alternative usage envisioned.

Hartfield Recreation Centre, located nearby, provides gymnasium facilities as well as opportunities for playing rugby league, soccer, baseball, cricket and tennis. Hartfield Park also contains the Darling Range Horse and Pony Club, the Hartfield Country Club (golf course), boy scouts, and car club rooms.

Wattle Grove is well connected to other regions of Perth due to its proximity to the Roe Highway and Tonkin Highway.
The most direct route to the Perth central business district is via Welshpool and Shepperton Roads (12 km all in 60 km/h zones), however alternative routes are available via Orrong Road / Graham Farmer Freeway (14 km in 70 & 80 km/h zones), Tonkin Highway / Great Eastern Highway (18 km in 100 & 60 km/h zones), and Roe Highway / Kwinana Freeway (23 km all in 100 km/h zone and the only route without traffic lights).

Wattle Grove has one major retail facility within its boundaries, containing Aldi, 7-Eleven and various other stores e.g. a bakery, a sushi shop and a gym. It has two vets, a motel, a number of nurseries, landscape suppliers, agistment paddocks, boarding kennels and a bird, fish and reptile shop.

The nearest police station is at Forrestfield, and public hospitals are available at Bentley and Kalamunda.

History
Prior to European settlement the Beeloo Whadjuk people occupied much of Wattle Grove. In 1827 the colonial botanist Charles Fraser and Captain James Stirling explored the region to evaluate its suitability for farming. Initially the area was used for forestry and orchards; fruit growing continues to be one of the major industries in Wattle Grove, Bickley and Orange Grove today. This suburb name may have come from a property that was in the area around 1920, or the name may have come about in the early 1900s from wattle trees that lined Welshpool Road; the district was described by the European settlers as "where the groves of wattle are".
Much of Wattle Grove has developed into other agricultural uses such as poultry farms, equestrian studs, agistment paddocks, horticultural nurseries, pet kennels, hobby farms and cattle breeders.
20 residents of Wattle Grove were killed in action during World War One (1914–1918), 5 of whom were from the one family.

Notable people
 David Birnie, serial killer

Recent events

After a concerted campaign was lost during the 1980s by the Save our Foothills action group a quarter of the suburb bounded by Welshpool Road, Tonkin Highway and Roe Highway has been rezoned as "urban development" by what was then the Shire of Kalamunda and is known as "cell 9" in the Kalamunda Shire Plans. This area of Wattle Grove is now a hive of activity as land is subdivided and houses built. The price of land in cell 9 has subsequently risen exponentially since the first subdivision in 1999.

References

Suburbs of Perth, Western Australia
Suburbs in the City of Kalamunda